Gunflint Lodge is one of the oldest and the best known lodges on the Gunflint Trail in Minnesota, United States. It is located on Gunflint Lake, on the border of Ontario, Canada, and is open year-round.

Built in 1925 by Dora Blankenburg and her son Russell Blankenburg, the lodge was sold in 1929 to May and Justine Spunner, and has been owned by them ever since. The family name changed in 1934 when Justine married Bill Kerfoot and her name became Justine Kerfoot. After Justine retired in the mid-80s, the lodge was run by her son Bruce and his second wife Sue Kerfoot.  They handed operations over to a son, Lee in 2001 through 2008. The Kerfoots announced their intentions to sell the lodge in 2013 and sold it in 2016. 

Some of the most popular activities at the lodge are fishing and hiking, and in the winter, dogsledding, cross-country skiing and snowshoeing.

The lodge was threatened by the Ham Lake Fire in spring of 2007, but avoided any damage.

References

External Links 
Hotels in Minnesota
Hunting in the United States
Hunting lodges in the United States

Justine Kerfoot, the Woman of the Boundary Waters, is interviewed by poet and Northwoods neighbor Joanne Hart, Northern Lights TV Series #47  (1988):  [https://reflections.mndigital.org/catalog/p16022coll38:161#/kaltura_video]